Nomonde Mbusi (born May 29, 1976) is a South African actress. In 2017, she was nominated for Africa Movie Academy Award for Best Actress in a Supporting Role for her role as "Thobeka" in Vaya.

Career 
Mbusi is an alumnus of University of Zululand, where she studied Dramatic Arts. In 2016, she played "Thobeka" in Akin Omotoso's Vaya. The role got her best supporting actress nomination at Africa Movie Academy Awards, with Omotoso winning the award for best director. The film also won several international awards, including being the opening film at African Film Festival. Mbusi played "Ayanda" in Ubizo. She also featured as "Ziyanda" in Tsha Tsha IV. She had a brief spell as "Mokopi" in Generations. She acted as "Felicia" in 4Play: Sex Tips for Girls in 2012. She has also done theatrical works, such as Flipping the Script as the character "Fikile". Her television appearance also include a character in Usindiso

Selected filmography 
 Usindiso 
 Ubizo:The Calling
 Vaya
 Generations

Personal life 
Mbusi was born May 29, 1976 in Durban, Kwa Mashu.

References

External links 
 

South African film actresses
South African television actresses
Living people
1976 births
People from Durban
University of Zululand alumni